SS James H. Courts was a Liberty ship built in the United States during World War II.

Construction
James H. Courts was laid down on 12 December 1944, under a Maritime Commission (MARCOM) contract, MC hull 2516, by the St. Johns River Shipbuilding Company, Jacksonville, Florida; she was sponsored by Mrs. A.H. Laney, the wife of the superintendent of the warehouse at St.Johns River SBC, and she was launched on 21 January 1945.

History
She was transferred to Greece, under the Lend-Lease program, on 31 January 1945. She was sold for commercial use, 18 December 1946, to Kassos Steam Navigation Co., Ltd., for $575,339.53.

References

Bibliography

 
 
 
 
 

 

Liberty ships
Ships built in Jacksonville, Florida
1945 ships
Liberty ships transferred to Greece